Peter Wakefield (born 6 September 1977 in Modbury, South Australia) is a retired male light flyweight boxer from Australia. He competed for his native country at the 2004 Summer Olympics in Athens, Greece, where he was stopped in the second round of the men's light flyweight division (– 48 kg) by Namibia's Joseph Jermia.

He was an Australian Institute of Sport scholarship holder.

References

sports-reference

1977 births
Living people
Flyweight boxers
Boxers at the 2004 Summer Olympics
Olympic boxers of Australia
Sportspeople from Adelaide
Australian Institute of Sport boxers
Australian male boxers